The Doctor's Secret (German: Geheimnis einer Ärztin) is a 1955 Austrian-West German crime drama film directed by August Rieger and Karl Stanzl and starring Hilde Krahl, Ewald Balser and Erik Frey. It was shot at studios in Vienna. The film's sets were designed by art director Fritz Jüptner-Jonstorff.

Synopsis
Doctor Gerda Maurer is found guilty of negligence and sent to prison. On her release she cannot return to her career in medicine and has to take on other jobs such as a nightclub singer. She is giving a second chance by a respected surgeon and works as his assistant, but her new position is threatened by the return of her former lover Georg.

Cast
 Hilde Krahl as Dr. Gerda Maurer
 Ewald Balser as Prof. Stephan Wendlandt
 Erik Frey as Georg Kreinz
 Egon von Jordan as 	Oberpolizeirat Werner Kröger
 Traute Wassler as 	Anita
 Hans Putz as 	Charly
 Elisabeth Stemberger as 	Ruth
 Jürgen Strasser as 	Fritz
 Rudolf Carl as 	Franz
 Evi Servaes as	Frau Kreinz
 Thomas Hörbiger as	Mitschüler Fritz
 Easy Maja as 	Negerin – Singer
 Fritz Muliar as 	Polizeiinspektor
 Raoul Retzer as 	Inspektor Bergmann
 Martin Costa as	Wirt
 Wolfgang Sauer as 	Blinder Pianist
 Guido Wieland as 	Strafverteidiger

References

Bibliography 
 Fritsche, Maria. Homemade Men in Postwar Austrian Cinema: Nationhood, Genre and Masculinity. Berghahn Books, 2013.

External links 
 

1955 films
1955 drama films
Austrian drama films
German drama films
West German films
1950s German-language films
Films directed by August Rieger
1950s German films

de:Geheimnis einer Ärztin